Dolon Pass is a pass located between the Songköl Too and the Bayduluu Range in Naryn Region, Kyrgyzstan. The road from Bishkek to Torugart (European route E125) runs over the pass.

In popular culture
In Chingiz Aitmatov's novella My Little Poplar in a Red Headscarf (from a collection of stories Tales of the Mountains and Steppes)  Dolon Pass is a part of the storyline as a difficult mountain pass.

References

Mountain passes of Kyrgyzstan